Phi Alpha is an American honor society for Social work students.  The organization is a member of the Association of College Honor Societies.

History
A group of undergraduate social work students at Michigan State University conceived of a national social work honor society  in 1960. After investigating, they determined that local chapters at three other schools. Michigan State, those three schools and a few other schools formed a National Honor Society Committee in November 1960. This committee worked on the constitution and other administrative matters. The name Phi Alpha was chosen since that was the name of the local chapter at Florida State University.
 
The formal organization and constitution were completed in 1962, and six chapters qualified to become "charter chapters."

The charter chapters were Florida State University, Michigan State University, Ohio Northern University, Central State College, University of Dayton, and the University of Tennessee. The honor society now has over 450 chapters.

Phi Alpha joined the Association of College Honor Societies in 1962.

See also
 Council on Social Work Education

References

External links
 
  ACHS Phi Alpha entry
  Phi Alpha chapter list at ACHS

Association of College Honor Societies
Social work organizations in the United States
Student organizations established in 1962
1962 establishments in Michigan